Balázs Tóth (born 4 September 1997) is a Hungarian football goalkeeper who plays for OTP Bank Liga club Puskás Akadémia FC.

Career statistics
.

References

External links
 
 

1997 births
Living people
People from Kazincbarcika
Hungarian footballers
Hungary youth international footballers
Association football goalkeepers
Puskás Akadémia FC players
Puskás Akadémia FC II players
Csákvári TK players
Nemzeti Bajnokság I players
Nemzeti Bajnokság III players
Sportspeople from Borsod-Abaúj-Zemplén County